Pterostylis insectifera, commonly known as the insect-lipped rufous greenhood, or leaden rustyhood is a plant in the orchid family Orchidaceae and is endemic to the south-west of Western Australia. Both flowering and non-flowering plants have a relatively large rosette of leaves. Flowering plants have a similar rosette and up to eight or more flowers which have long, stiffly-held lateral sepals and a protruding, insect-like labellum.

Description
Pterostylis insectifera is a terrestrial,  perennial, deciduous, herb with an underground tuber and a rosette of between five and twelve leaves. Flowering plants have a rosette at the base of the flowering stem but the leaves are usually withered by flowering time. The lateral sepals turn downwards, towards the ovary and are stiffly-held and narrower than the galea. Flowering occurs from September to November.

Taxonomy and naming
Pterostylis insectifera was first formally described in 1989 by Mark Clements from a specimen he cultured in the Australian National Botanic Gardens in 1980. The original material was collected by Clements, east of Hyden and the description was published in Australian Orchid Research. The specific epithet (insectifera) is derived from the Latin insectiferum meaning 'insect bearing', referring to the insect-like labellum.

Distribution and habitat
The insect-lipped rufous greenhood grows in woodland and shrubland, sometimes on granite outcrops between Karroun Hill, Ravensthorpe and Norseman in the Avon Wheatbelt, Coolgardie, Esperance Plains and Mallee biogeographic regions.

Conservation
Pterostylis insectifera  is classified as "not threatened" by the Western Australian Government Department of Parks and Wildlife.

References

insectifera
Endemic orchids of Australia
Orchids of Western Australia
Plants described in 1989